The Kiseleff Cup is contested between the rugby union teams of Romania (The Oaks) and Russia (The Bears). The cup is named after the Count Pavel Kiselyov, a Russian who influenced the first ever constitutions to being signed in both Wallachia and Moldavia, now Romania and Moldova.

The Kiselyov Cup is contested each time Romania and Russia meet in a senior international match other than World Cup matches. The holder retains the cup unless the challenger wins the match in normal time.

History
The Romanian Rugby Federation and the Rugby Union of Russia wanted to establish a similar cup like the Antim Cup that would be played annually between Romania and Russia and would have started just before the beginning of the new year in 2020, but those plans had to be pushed back to the Coronavirus.

It was decided that the cup should be named after Pavel Kiselyov (Romania: Pavel Kiseleff) (Russian: Па́вел Киселёв/Pavel Kiselev) (c. 1788–1872) a Russian Count that was well integrated in Romanian history.

Previous winners

Summary

See also
 Antim Cup

References

External links
 Trophies from rugbyfootballhistory.com

Romania national rugby union team
Russia national rugby union team
Rugby union international rivalry trophies
International rugby union competitions hosted by Romania
International rugby union competitions hosted by Russia